James Burleigh (24 February 1869 – 1917) was an English footballer who played as an outside left for Wolverhampton Wanderers in the Football League.

Although mostly only employed as a reserve, Burleigh made two appearances for Wolves' first team during September 1891.

References

1869 births
1917 deaths
English footballers
Footballers from Wolverhampton
Wolverhampton Wanderers F.C. players
English Football League players
Association football wingers
Willenhall F.C. players